Ditrigona conflexaria is a moth in the family Drepanidae. It was described by Strand in 1917. It is found in China, Japan and Taiwan.

The wingspan is 16-17.5 mm for males and 17-20.5 mm for females. The fore- and hindwings are weakly lustrous white or buff, the forewings with the costa buff, darkening proximally. There are four brownish yellow fasciae. The hindwings are as the forewings.

Subspecies
D. c. conflexaria (northern China)
D. c. cerodeta Wilkinson, 1968 (China: Yunnan)
D. c. micronioides (Strand, 1916) (eastern China, Taiwan, Japan)

References

Moths described in 1917
Drepaninae
Moths of Asia